Genius is сriminal drama with elements of satire, directed by Victor Sergeev in 1991.

Plot
1991, Saint Petersburg, last days of the USSR. Director of a greengrocery Sergei Nenashev earns money not only with trade, but also with fraud. However, he acts as a kind of Robin Hood: the victims of his scams are government officials, and other, often much more dangerous crooks. Some time ago, Nenashev worked at a secret research institution where he authored a number of technical innovations to which application was not found in the conditions of the Soviet economy. However now Nenashev with his associates expertly use these "gadgets" in fraud.

As a result of a "transaction", a batch of "Parabolic antenna's", fake, of course, were sold to Azerbaijanis who trade flowers on the market. A little later, having received incriminating videos of the intimate kind featuring businessman Baev (orgy with prostitutes) and theater director Arkhipov (homosexual act with a young waiter), Nenashev starts to blackmail both of them. Attempts by the police to arrest Nenashev while he is getting the money are thwarted: each time Sergei finds an ingenious way to outwit the police.

Nenashev has a teenage daughter from his first marriage, but after the divorce, he is alone. Suddenly, at the hairdresser Sergei meets Nastya, a very beautiful girl from a simple working family. Parents of Nastya perceive "speculator" Nenashev's flirting in a very negative way, Nastya herself also believes that she is just another "plaything" for the cynical rich man. However, a longer acquaintance with Nenashev assures Nastya that Sergei sincerely loves her, and then reciprocal feelings awaken in the girl.

Trouble comes from an unexpected side. Exiled for petty theft Kostya, Nenashev's assistant, finds the Azerbaijanis with fake antennas and their benefactor - powerful mafioso "Prince" Gilya. "Prince", wanting to punish Nenashev who deceived him, orders him to pay a huge sum of money, taking as hostage Sergei's daughter. Having sold all the property and taking money in debt, Nenashev collects the necessary amount, but "Prince" requires a new redemption, this time in a foreign currency. So without letting go of Nenashev's daughter, mafia takes Nastya as hostage too.

Realizing that he alone can not do anything, Nenashev refers to the police, which has been on the hunt of the "Prince" for a long time. Employees of the department for combating organized crime agree to help Nenashev, but in return he must write a written statement describing all the occurrences of his fraud. Sergei personally writes it, receives the dollars from the police and goes to meet the "Prince". During the transfer of money a special police unit storms the suburban cottage of the mafioso. The "Prince" is arrested, and his chief henchman "Mormon" dies in the crossfire and Kostya who betrayed Nenashev.

Nastya and Nenashev's daughter are released, and Sergei wants to take them home. However, Major Kuzmin has Nenashev's confession and is ready to arrest him but... in response he receives the latest "trick" of the genius swindler. Sergei wrote the text with invisible ink, the evidence has disappeared, and now the stunned Major only possesses an empty sheet of paper.

Cast
 Aleksandr Abdulov  as  Sergei Vladimirovich Nenashev, "Daddy"
 Larisa Belogurova as Nastya Smirnova
 Yury Kuznetsov as Andrey Sergeevich Kuzmin, police major
 Innokenty Smoktunovsky as Mafia leader Gilya 
 Viktor Ilichyov   as Makar, Nenashev's henchman
 Sergei Prokhanov    as Kostya, Nenashev's henchman
 Anatoly Kuznetsov as Valentin Smirnov, Nastya's dad
 Valentina Talyzina as Lubov Smirnova, Nastya's mom
 Victor Kostetskiy as Ivan Vazhin, police major
 Algis Matulionis as Uvarov, police colonel
 Anastasiya Melnikova as policewoman
 Boris Klyuyev as Aleksandr Aleksandrovich Arkhipov, director of theater 
 Viktor Smirnov as Aleksei Nikolaevich Baev, businessman
 Tamara Shempel as Baev's wife
 Lev Lemke as Prof. Nathanson
 Gabriel Vorobyov as waiter
 Alina Mikhalova as Natasha, Nenashev's daughter

Awards
At the 1992 Kinotavr film festival, screenwriter Igor Ageev received a special jury prize for his work on the film.

References

External links
 

1990s crime drama films
1991 films
Soviet crime drama films
1990s Russian-language films
Lenfilm films
Films scored by Eduard Artemyev
1991 drama films